Chah Sorkh (also Romanized as Chāh Sorkh) is a village in Sarvestan Rural District, in the Central District of Sarvestan County, Fars Province, Iran. At the 2006 census, its population was 42, in 7 families.

References 

Populated places in Sarvestan County